Fife is a city in Pierce County, Washington, United States and a suburb of Tacoma. The population was 10,999 at the 2020 census. Fife is contained within the Puyallup Indian Reservation.

History
The lower Puyallup basin is the ancestral home of the Puyallup people, who were relocated after the signing of the Medicine Creek Treaty in 1854. The treaty ceded Puyallup lands and created the Puyallup Indian Reservation, which was expanded to include modern-day Fife. The land on which the city sits was lost after the signing of the General Allotment Act in 1887 and other land transfers that were later resolved in a 1990 claims settlement.

In 1940, Fife was described as "at a valley crossroads in the midst of a thickly settled berry growing and truck-gardening district is represented by a string of markets, taverns, shops, and a large, balloon-roofed dance hall along the highway." The 1940 population was 135. Fife was officially incorporated on February 11, 1957.

Due to the increased traffic volume traveling from Puyallup and Tacoma, Fife felt the need to establish itself as autonomous community, not just as an intermediate area between Interstate 5 (I-5) and State Route 167.

Fife may have been named for William J. Fife, a prominent Tacoma lawyer, Yukon prospector, once head of the Washington National Guard, and a lieutenant colonel in the field during the Philippine Insurrection. There is also a historic county of Scotland and former Pictish kingdom called Fife, which could also be a source of the city's name.

Economy
Fife, an eastern suburb of Tacoma, consists primarily of businesses such as car dealerships, warehousing and industrial facilities, motels, drive through smoke shops, quick-dining restaurants as well as a Native American casino and various other highway-side businesses. Its proximity to the Port of Tacoma, Interstate 5, and Highway 167 has contributed to the large number of freight forwarding companies. Fife's tax base is made up of sales tax, utility tax, and property tax. Fife Heights, located on a hill beyond the incorporated bounds of the city, is a primarily residential area. Milton is located immediately to the east and Edgewood to the southeast.

Geography
Fife is located at  (47.234439, -122.359690). It is entirely within the Puyallup Indian Reservation created in 1854, but title is held almost entirely by non-Native Americans.

Fife is also a tideflat community, residing in the low, flat area extending from the Port of Tacoma. Consequently, during the day, as the tide rises and falls in the Puget Sound, so do parts of land slightly rise and fall.

The southern portions of the city are in the floodplain of the Puyallup River. Much of the city would be damaged or destroyed in the event of a lahar due to an eruption of Mount Rainier.

Demographics

2010 census
At the census of 2010, there were 9,173 people, 3,642 households, and 2,192 families living in the city. The racial makeup of the city was 55.2% White, 8.2% African American, 3.0% Native American, 15.5% Asian, 2.7% Pacific Islander, 7.6% other races, and 7.8% from two or more races. Hispanic or Latino of any race were 17.4%.

Of the 3,642 households 35.4% had children under the age of 18 living with them, 39.8% were married couples living together, 13.7% had a female householder with no husband present, 6.6% had a male householder with no wife present, and 39.8% were non-families. 29.7% of households were one person and 4.2% were one person aged 65 or older. The average household size was 2.50 and the average family size was 3.12.

The median age was 30.9 years. 25.7% of residents were under the age of 18; 10.5% were between the ages of 18 and 24; 36.9% were from 25 to 44; 20.4% were from 45 to 64; and 6.5% were 65 or older. The gender makeup of the city was 50.4% male and 49.6% female.

2000 census
At the census of 2000, there were 4,784 people, 2,111 households, and 1,123 families living in the city. The population density was 859.7 people per square mile (332.2/km). There were 2,232 housing units at an average density of 401.1 per square mile (155.0/km). The racial makeup of the city was 68.62% White, 6.81% African American, 4.14% Native American, 6.50% Asian, 1.23% Pacific Islander, 6.94% from other races, and 5.75% from two or more races. Hispanic or Latino of any race were 13.55% of the population.

Of the 2,111 households 30.4% had children under the age of 18 living with them, 32.4% were married couples living together, 14.4% had a female householder with no husband present, and 46.8% were non-families. 37.5% of households were one person and 6.6% were one person aged 65 or older. The average household size was 2.24 and the average family size was 3.00.

The age distribution was 25.8% under the age of 18, 14.4% from 18 to 24, 34.9% from 25 to 44, 17.3% from 45 to 64, and 7.5% 65 or older. The median age was 29 years. For every 100 females, there were 106.7 males. For every 100 females age 18 and over, there were 106.3 males.

The median household income was $31,806 and the median family income was $36,250. Males had a median income of $30,963 versus $25,101 for females. The per capita income for the city was $16,723. About 12.6% of families and 14.9% of the population were below the poverty line, including 19.8% of those under age 18 and 7.9% of those age 65 or over.

Education

The majority of the city limits is in the Fife Public Schools, which also includes Milton and parts of Edgewood. The district has one high school, Fife High School.

Other parts of Fife are in the Puyallup School District.

Notable people
 Dr. Mark Emmert, former president of the University of Washington and president of the National Collegiate Athletic Association
 Frank Herbert, author known for the Dune series
 Kaleb McGary, American football offensive tackle for the Atlanta Falcons

References

External links
 City of Fife
 

Cities in Washington (state)
Cities in Pierce County, Washington
Cities in the Seattle metropolitan area
1957 establishments in Washington (state)
Puyallup Indian Reservation